All of the following people were born in New England or spent a significant portion of their life in New England, making them a well-known figure in the region. This includes people who were born in or lived in the U.S. states of Vermont, New Hampshire, Maine, Massachusetts, Connecticut, and Rhode Island. Some of them, like Robert Frost, who was actually born in California, emigrated to New England and are now considered to be icons of the region. All of them exemplify some aspect of the region in one way or another.

Abbie Hoffman
Adam Sandler
Some members of Aerosmith
Aimee Mann
Alan B. Shepard, Jr.
Alicia Witt
Alisan Porter
Amar Bose
Amos Bronson Alcott
Amy Jo Johnson
Amy Poehler
Anna Kendrick
Anne Sexton
Anthony Michael Hall
Barbara Walters
Ben Affleck 
Benjamin Franklin
Bernie Sanders
Bette Davis
Bill Belichick
Bill Burr
Bill De Blasio
William "Billy" Bulger
Bobby Brown
Bobby Farrelly
Richard Buckminster Fuller
Calvin Coolidge
Carly Simon
Casey Affleck
Charles Bulfinch
Charles Ives
Charlie Day
Clara Barton
Claus von Bülow
Chris Evans
Conan O'Brien
Cotton Mather
Crispus Attucks
Dan Brown
Dane Cook
Daniel Shays
Daniel Webster
David Byrne
Debra Messing
Denis Leary
Dick Dale
Donna Summer
Donnie Wahlberg
Doug Flutie
E. E. Cummings
Edgar Allan Poe
Edward Brooke
Edward Gorey
Edward Norton
Eli Whitney
Elisabeth Hasselbeck
Elizabeth Warren
Ellen Pompeo
Emily Dickinson
Ephraim Morse
Ethel Kennedy
Eugene Mirman
Frank Miller
Franklin Pierce
Frederick Douglass
George HW Bush
George M. Cohan
George W Bush
George Mitchell
H. Jon Benjamin
H. P. Lovecraft
Hannibal Hamlin
Harriet Beecher Stowe
Henry David Thoreau
Howard Dean
Jack Kerouac
James J. "Whitey" Bulger
James Naismith
James Taylor
James Woods
Jamie Loftus
Jay Harrington
Jay Leno
Joe Perry
Joe Raposo
Joey Graceffa
John Adams
John Cena
John F. Kennedy
John Ford
John Greenleaf Whittier
John Hancock
John Irving
John Kerry
John Krasinski
John Quincy Adams
John Singleton Copley
John Steinbeck
John Updike
Johnny Appleseed
JoJo (singer)
Jonathan Edwards
Jonathan Richman
Joseph Grew
Joseph Lieberman
Joseph P. Kennedy, Sr.
Josh Meyers
Joshua Chamberlain
Josiah Quincy II
Josiah Quincy III
Josiah Quincy, Jr.
Josiah Quincy
Joyner Lucas
Jun Hasegawa
Junius Morgan
Katharine Hepburn
Katharine Lee Bates
Katie Nolan
Ken Olsen
Kevin Eastman
Leonard Bernstein
Leonard Nimoy
Lilla Cabot Perry
Lizzie Borden
Henry Wadsworth Longfellow
Louis Sullivan
Louisa May Alcott 
Matt Leblanc
Mandy Moore
Mark Wahlberg
Maria Menounos
Mary Dyer
Massasoit
Matt Damon
Meghan Trainor
Meredith Viera
King Philip
Michael Dukakis
Mindy Kaling
Misha Collins
Mitt Romney
Nathaniel Hawthorne
New Kids on the Block
Norm Crosby
Oliver Wendell Holmes
Olympia Snowe
Patrick Dempsey
Patrick Ewing
Patrick J. Kennedy 
Patrick Sharp
Paul Revere
Paul Tsongas
Peter Farrelly
Peter Laird
Peter Wolf
Rachael MacFarlane
Rachel Dratch
Rachel Nichols
Ralph Nader
Ralph Waldo Emerson
Ric Ocasek
Richard Cushing
Robert Ellis Cahill
Robert Frost
Robert Goulet
Robert F. Kennedy
Robert Kraft
Robert Lowell
Roger Williams
Ronnie James Dio
Rose Fitzgerald Kennedy
Rosemary Kennedy
Rowland Hussey Macy
Ruth Buzzi
Sam Hyde
Samuel Adams
Samuel Slater
Sarah Silverman
Sawyer Fredericks
Sean Patrick Maloney
Seth MacFarlane
Seth Meyers
Spalding Gray
Squanto
Stephen King
Stephanie McMahon
Steve Carell
Steven Tyler
Sumner Redstone
Sunny von Bülow
Susan B. Anthony
Sylvia Plath
Taylor Schilling
Edward "Ted" Kennedy
Theo Epstein
 Dr. Seuss
Theodore Parker
Tip O'Neill
Trey Anastasio
Triple H
Vincent K. McMahon
Will McDonough
William Cohen
William James Sidis
William "Bill" Weld
Winslow Homer

See also
New England Auto Racers Hall of Fame

people
New England
New England